The following is a list of episodes of the television series The Tonight Show Starring Johnny Carson which aired in 1965:

January

February

March

April

May

June

July

August

September

October

November

December

Tonight Show Starring Johnny Carson, The
Tonight Show Starring Johnny Carson, The
The Tonight Show Starring Johnny Carson